Maria Băsescu (née Andrușca) (born September 6, 1951) is the wife of the 4th President of Romania Traian Băsescu. She was the First Lady of Romania from 2004 to 2014.

Honours
:
 Dame Grand Cross of the Order of Isabella the Catholic (2007)

References

External links
http://a1.ro/showbiz/vedete/maria-basescu-si-a-sarbatorit-ziua-de-nastere-alaturi-de-sofia-anais-nepoata-ei-id157945.html
 Romania's first lady first public reaction, during electoral campaign, triggered by accusations brought to her husband
http://www.nineoclock.ro/maria-basescu-denies-divorce/
http://www.zimbio.com/pictures/NM_JHdzSucq/Prince+Felipe+Princess+Letizia+Visit+Romania/YH26_rmGDLx/Maria+Basescu
http://www.romaniatv.net/doamnele-politicii-romanesti-sub-lupa-iuliei-albu-ce-note-au-primit-maria-basescu-eba-si-elena-udrea_161027.html
http://www.kanald.ro/iulia-albu-a-pus-ochii-pe-femeile-din-politica-ce-spune-despre-mariei-si-elenei-basescu--dar-si-despre-ale-elenei-udrea-si-ioana-petrescu_42891.html
http://www.bzi.ro/maria-basescu-implineste-astazi-61-de-ani-galerie-foto-inedita-312361
http://biografii.famouswhy.ro/maria_basescu/

1951 births
Living people
People from Suceava County
First Ladies of Romania